Homerton Healthcare NHS Foundation Trust is an NHS foundation trust based in London, England, which runs Homerton University Hospital.

History 
The trust was established as Homerton Hospital NHS Trust on 24 December 1994, and became operational on 1 April 1995. It took over some of the services previously provided by the East London and The City Health Authority. It became a foundation trust on 1 April 2004, and was one of the first foundation trusts to be established.

It was named by the Health Service Journal as one of the top hundred NHS trusts to work for in 2015.  At that time it had 3330 full-time equivalent staff and a sickness absence rate of 3.09%. 78% of staff recommend it as a place for treatment and 75% recommended it as a place to work.

The trust had a document for staff saying “I will only communicate in English in the presence of others.” It was written in 2014. It was criticised by Dr Partha Kar an NHS England national advisor on racial equality, but the trust stood by it as part of their trust values.

Services 
The trust provides the majority of its services from a single site, Homerton University Hospital, in Homerton in the London Borough of Hackney. It also provides community health services from a number of sites across Hackney and the City of London, and healthcare services at the Mary Seacole Nursing Home in Hoxton.

When the trust proposed in 2020 to extend its soft facilities management contract with ISS Mediclean until 2025 170 of the trust's 464 doctors complained to the chief executive that their colleagues in cleaning, portering, catering and security services received worse pay and worse terms and conditions than NHS employees, including only statutory sick pay.

Performance
Five maternal deaths occurred at Homerton between 2013 and 2015.  Two unannounced inspections by the Care Quality Commission and an investigation by the Clinical Senate concluded that were staff were slow at recognising patients were deteriorating, and there had been breakdowns in communication.  The Commission inspected maternity services at the hospital again in March 2015 and said they were "inadequate" for safety and "requires improvement" overall. None of the midwives they spoke to were aware of the deaths.

In April 2014 and again in February 2016 the CQC rated the A&E department as 'outstanding', the first emergency department to receive this rating.

It spent 8.9% of its total turnover on agency staff in 2014/5.

See also 
 Healthcare in London
 List of NHS trusts

References

External links 
 
 Homerton University Hospital NHS Foundation Trust on the NHS website
 Inspection reports from the Care Quality Commission

NHS foundation trusts
Health in the London Borough of Hackney